Port Sorell is an extinct aboriginal language of Tasmania in the reconstruction of Claire Bowern. It was spoken near Port Sorell, in the center of the north coast, just east of Northern Tasmanian proper. Dixon & Crowley agree that there is unlikely to be a close connection to other varieties of Tasmanian.

Port Sorell Tasmanian is attested from two word lists: One of 268 words collected by Charles Robinson at Port Sorell, and another of only 77 words, the "Little Jemmie’s" vocabulary collected by George Augustus Robinson.

References

Northern Tasmanian languages
Languages extinct in the 19th century